Donanemab (USAN; development code LY3002813)  is a biological drug in trial to treat early symptoms of Alzheimer's disease. There is no cure or treatment for Alzheimer’s disease. Donanemab has shown positive results in Eli Lilly and Co.’s first two trials. Donanemab was developed by the company Eli Lilly and Co, used in past and current trials as a possible source of treatment for the heterogeneous condition Alzheimer’s disease. Donanemab, also known as N3pG, is an antibody produced in mice that targets an abnormal protein, amyloid beta (Aβ), that is produced in the bone marrow. Whilst the cause of Alzheimer’s disease is still unknown, great advances in amyloid pathology have led to a relation between the quantity of Aβ peptides and the development of Alzheimer's disease. Aβ peptides are deposited in the brain and when in excess will bind together to create a protein plaque. Donanemab targets this protein plaque, clearing the excess protein which causes a burden in the brain.

Development
Donanemab was developed from a biological origin which was conducted in the company’s research labs. Transgenic mice were used to source the humanised antibodies as DNA was injected during the embryotic stage. The mice used had a modified genetic sequence more similar to humans leading to antibodies that are genetically similar to ones produced by humans. To produce the antibody to create donanemab, mice were injected with a specific antigen, a non-self-cell, which induces an immune response. White blood cells are produced to destroy the antigen. B cells, which are a type of white blood cell, produce antibodies to bind and destroy the antigen. Antibodies produced are then harvested from the mouse to be fused with cancer B cells. This hybrid cell produces monoclonal antibodies used as the drug donanemab, that has the function of a B cell but long life of a Myeloma.

Donanemab and Aβ peptide
The recent improvements in amyloid imaging technology have linked the excess Aβ peptide outside the cell with the development of Alzheimer's disease. The overproduction of the Aβ peptide creates a plaque in certain parts of the brain, disrupting neuron transmission. Donanemab attacks the soluble and insoluble plaque buildup, slowing down the progression of the disease.

Trials

Phase 1

First study
In the United states and Japan, Lilly’s company ran the Phase 1 study from May 2013 to August 2016. The study was conducted on patients with mild Alzheimer’s disease shown through a positive amyloid PET scan that was conducted on each patient. 100 participants were injected intravenously with donanemab up to 4 times monthly. Phase 1 was part of a multi-armed study that used one control group across the different trials. The positive result indicated that the patients had excess amyloid protein in the brain depicting an early sign of Alzheimer's disease.Each month doses of 0.1 mg/kg to 10 mg/kg were injected into males and non-fertile females at an average age of 74.  Up to four injections occurred monthly until adverse events led Lilly to alter the trial, increasing the number of injections up to 8 per month and increasing the dosage of patients from 0.1 mg/kg to 0.3 mg/kg. The change in dosages was in conjunction with the decrease in participants from 37 documented volunteers to 9 participants with results available to the public.

Lilly revealed that there were adverse events for the 37 patients who received the treatment and 12 volunteers who received the placebo. The highest dose of Donanemab infused into the blood stream reduced the effect of the plaque burden in the brain. An overall finding was that the higher dosage led to 40% reduction in protein plaques in the brain. There were no adverse symptoms when they were given a singular dose. Donanemab was found to be very immunogenic, creating an immune response that increases the efficiency of the original antibody infused. In the next part of the trial where patients received multiple doses, six patients had an infusion reaction which included chills, flushing, dizziness, rash, and fever. No patients had ARIA-E but there were cases of ARIA-H leaving small haemorrhages in the brain. The two cases with ARIA-H were asymptomatic. Most people developed anti-drug antibodies lowering the drug's effectiveness, with a short half-life of ten days.

Second study
The second phase 1 study was conducted in December 2015 in the United states and Japan. This Phase had 150 participants, increasing the sample size by 50 people. The method was altered in comparison with the first study conducted. This trial used three different dosing regimens: one with a single dosage of 10, 20, or 40 mg/kg, another with 10 mg/kg every other week for 24 weeks, and a third with 10 or 20 mg/kg every month for 16 months. The participants were randomly selected to  be a part of either the placebo group or the real trial, with a ratio of 3:1.  The aim of this trial was the same as the first, primarily measuring the effectiveness on reducing amyloid brain plaques.

The increase in dosage led to a larger percentage of patients experiencing symptomatic ARIA-E, rising to 1 in 4 participants. Auto-antibodies were also becoming problematic for donanemab, recognising the drug as a non-self cell leading to the body fighting against the drug. Anti-drug antibodies, which fall under auto-antibodies were produced in nearly every patient. Whilst this trial showed a positive outcome for patients taking monthly doses for 16 months as the amyloid PET scan became negative, the trial ended in August 2019.

TRAILBLAZER-ALZ 
The Phase 2 trial methodically differed from Phase 1, altering the duration, the amount of donanemab, and the number of patients. There was an increase in the amount of donanemab infused into the bloodstream every month for 72 weeks. The patients infused with donanemab and infused with the placebo became equal, creating close to a 1:1 ratio with 257 patients in total. For the first three doses 700 mg was infused and 1400 mg of donanemab for every dose after that. A PET scan was also used to measure the amount of plaque in the brain. TRAILBLAZER-ALZ was the method used to improve the placebo-controlled group as it was randomised. It assessed the safety and efficacy of donanemab.

It consisted of a  trial combining two experimental drugs under Lilly that target separate parts of the amyloid cascade. The goal of this Phase 2 trial was to see how safe, tolerable, and effective an 18-month term of donanemab alone and in combination with Lilly's BACE inhibitor LY3202626 was. This BACE inhibitor was administered orally compared to donanemab which is intravenously injected. To effectively see the comparison between patients only taking donanemab and patients taking both of Lily's drugs was effectively achieved by studying three separate groups. One group had donanemab injections and orally received  Lilly's BACE inhibitor, another had only donanemab injections, and the third was the placebo group. It planned to enroll 375 people whose memories had been deteriorating for at least six months and who scored above a certain threshold on the CogState Bridging Test but ended up with 257 participants. There was an overview on the adverse drug reactions (iADRS) when taking donanemab and the scores were very similar to the placebo group, showing no significant difference. There were cases of ARIA-E but only asymptomatic which is an improvement from the symptomatic patients seen in Phase 1. Lilly decided to continue trials for donanemab but discontinue the trials with the BACE inhibitor in October in 2018. In 2021 the TRAILBLAZER-ALZ trial was completed, indicating the current success of donanemab as it slows down the development of AD; but with the side effects still being problematic, further investigation is needed.

Results
There was a reduction in plaque level which was highlighted through improved cognition and ability to perform daily activities. Phase 2 showed promising results at the beginning without analysing its effects and the data in detail. It was concluded that there was no substantial difference in the results between the placebo group and the patients infused with donanemab. After Phase 2 donanemab stopped the trial.

Phase 3
In October and November 2020 Lilly has been looking to extend the TRAILBLAZER-ALZ to have a second study with the first half of the results aimed to be released in 2023. They are expanding their sample group to include Canada, The Netherlands, and Poland. The study will be run at 87 sites across these countries.

Cerebral edema

In the larger doses of donanemab, patients had cerebral edema (brain swelling). Cerebral edema is commonly known as ARIA-E, with some patients being asymptomatic and others symptomatic. A large percentage of symptomatic patients discontinued the drug because they experienced feelings of nausea.

See also
 Aducanumab, a similar monoclonal amyloid beta antibody treatment for Alzheimer's developed by Biogen.

References

Experimental drugs
Monoclonal antibodies
Treatment of Alzheimer's disease